Hanai (written:  lit "flower well") is a Japanese surname. Notable people with the surname include:

Kiyoaki Hanai, Japanese racing driver
, Japanese actress
, Japanese actress, model and former rhythmic gymnast
, Japanese footballer

Fictional characters
, a character in the manga series School Rumble

See also
Hānai, the Hawaiian cultural practice of informal adoption
Hanai Sarrigan, a village in Hormozgan Province, Iran
Saeed Hanaei

Japanese-language surnames